Koltai is a Hungarian surname. Notable people with the surname include:

Lajos Koltai (born 1946), Hungarian cinematographer and film director
Otto Koltai, Hungarian sprint canoeist
Ralph Koltai, British stage director
Róbert Koltai (born 1943), Hungarian actor, film director and screenwriter
Tamás Koltai (born 1987), Hungarian footballer

Hungarian-language surnames